Eliana Bórmida (born 29 July 1946) is an Argentine architect, co-owner of the Bórmida & Yanzón studio, based in Mendoza, Argentina and specializing in wine cellars. Since 1988 the studio has worked on projects for more than 30 wineries, which have been disseminated in national and international media, and several have received awards. Bórmida combines her activity at the studio with academic pursuits, developing an extensive career in the field of heritage preservation. In 2012 she received the Konex Award for Architecture.

Early years
In childhood, Eliana Bórmida became interested in the humanities, art, drawing, and reading. She studied at a normal high school and was determined to study philosophy. When she was in high school she traveled to Chicago on an exchange scholarship, and there she became interested in architecture when she met an architect, a relative of the family that she was staying with. When she returned home, Bórmida enrolled in the University of Mendoza's recently inaugurated Faculty of Architecture. She graduated in 1972. Her classmate Mario Yanzón later became her partner and husband.

Career

Bórmida and Yanzón formed an eponymous studio whose projects are led by both of them. After their divorce, the associates continued working together in the same arrangement. One of their daughters, Luisa Yanzón, is an architect and also works for the studio doing interior design.

Bórmida's works are based on an integrative conceptualization of architecture and context, understood as a natural and cultural landscape, which seeks to give architecture a transcendent support and projection, to contribute to regional identity. Her experience comes from professional practice and also from university teaching and research. She has been a Professor Emeritus at the University of Mendoza since 2011, where she was Associate Professor of History of Architecture and Urban Planning from 1973 to 2005 and founder and director of the Institute of Architectural and Urban Culture. Alberto Nicolini worked with her to consolidate the institute, which was something exceptional in a private university. There she developed themes of cultural heritage and Andean regional identity and initiated a line of research on Cultural Heritage of Wine in Mendoza. She was called on by the Regional Government of Andalusia to edit, together with Graciela Moretti, an architectural guide for Mendoza.

From 1995 to 2003 she was a delegate of the National Commission of Museums and of Monuments and Historical Places (CNMMyLH) and of the International Council on Monuments and Sites (ICOMOS) Argentina. Bórmida started on this track early in her career when she participated in the meetings organized by the Institute of History coordinated by Marina Waisman, a pioneer in the field in Argentina. In 2007 she was recognized by the Office of the President of Italy with the Order of the Star of Italian Solidarity. In 2014 she was declared an illustrious citizen of the city of Mendoza.

She is currently engaged in her activity with the studio and maintains an active participation in meetings and specialized publications related to agro-industrial architecture, agricultural tourism, and the conservation and promotion of natural and cultural heritage.

Selected works
 Bodega Atamisque / Capilla de la Gratitud
 Bodega Salentein, Mendoza
 Bodega Séptima, Mendoza
 Bodega Diamandes, Mendoza
 Bodega O Fournier, Mendoza
 Pulenta Estate
 Bodega Navarro Correas
 Killka Espacio Salentein

Awards
 Premio Edificar, 2002, 2006, 2008, and 2010
 Order of the Star of Italian Solidarity, 2007
 ARQ Award, 2nd Prizes for Major Scale and Average Scale, 2010/2011

 Konex Award, 2012
 Illustrious citizen of the city of Mendoza, 2014

References

External links

 
 Bormida & Yanzón

1946 births
20th-century Argentine architects
Argentine women architects
Living people
University of Mendoza alumni
21st-century architects